Palampur Himachal railway station is a small railway station in Kangra district in the Indian state of Himachal Pradesh. The station lies on Kangra Valley Railway. It was allotted the railway code of PLMX under the jurisdiction of Firozpur railway division. The -wide narrow gauge was opened for traffic in 1929. In 1929 the line was regauged to -wide narrow gauge.

Trains 

 52464/52463 Baijnath–Pathankot Kangra Valley Rail Passenger
 52468/52467 Baijnath–Pathankot Kangra Valley Rail Passenger
 52466/52465 Baijnath–Pathankot Kangra Valley Rail Passenger
 52470/52469 Joginder Nagar–Pathankot Kangra Valley Rail Passenger
 52472/52471 Joginder Nagar–Pathankot Kangra Valley Passenger
 52474/52473 Joginder Nagar–Pathankot Kangra Valley Passenger

References

See also
 Joginder Nagar railway station
 Kangra railway station
 Jawalamukhi Road railway station
 Pathankot Junction railway station

Railway stations in Kangra district
Firozpur railway division
Railway stations opened in 1929
Railway stations in Himachal Pradesh

British-era buildings in Himachal Pradesh